Hans Christian Østerby (born 20 December 1955) is a Danish politician and the current and second Mayor of Holstebro Municipality. He is a member of the Danish Social Democrats, and he succeeded the former and first mayor Arne Lægaard (V) on 1 January 2010.

References 

1955 births
Living people
Mayors of places in Denmark